Ris Low (Chinese: 刘依敏) was crowned Miss Singapore World 2009 on 31 July 2009. She stepped down on 29 September 2009 after a case of credit fraud was revealed. She is currently taking up a diploma in Health Science, Hospitality and a diploma in Nursing at the Management Development Institute of Singapore.

Low was ranked as one of the 25 most influential people or groups in Asia in 2009 by a division of the United States news network CNN. She was appointed as a spokesperson by a condom company, to raise awareness about safe sex.

Miss Singapore World

Crowning
Low participated in Miss Singapore World 2009 and was crowned Miss Singapore World on 31 July 2009. In addition to winning the crown, she was also named the following: Miss Community Ambassadress 2009, Miss Lumiere Ambassadress 2009, Miss Best Dressed 2009, Miss Dazzling Eyes 2009, Miss Photogenic 2009, Miss Crowning Glory 2009, and Miss Best in Catwalk 2009.

Low has been criticised for her English-language skills. The organiser of the Singapore franchise of the Miss World beauty pageant, ERM World Marketing, defended Low's winning of the crown. A representative said that Low had performed excellently throughout the competition and won eight special awards. The representative also claimed that a one-off fashion interview had misled the public into believing she spoke English poorly. During the final competition, "[Low] spoke perfectly good English, had a good answer, and performed very well to impress the eleven judges that she was good enough to win."

Credit fraud
On 25 September 2009, it was revealed that she had been convicted of credit card fraud in May 2009, and was sentenced to two years' probation. She faced five charges of misappropriation, cheating using illegally obtained credit cards, and impersonating their users' identities prior to winning the title of Miss Singapore World 2009. Low claimed she was unaware of the fact that she needed to declare the offence, and only declared it two months after the pageant when she was required to sign a contract. Legal issues may be involved if Low needs to travel, and she may have her title revoked. ERM World Marketing declined to comment on the issue, although an employee was quoted to have said "Singaporeans did not pay for (Ris Low)" when asked if Ris would keep her crown.

Stepping down 
After initially resisting calls to give up her crown, Low voluntarily stepped down on 29 September 2009. She felt that it would be better for everyone and that giving up the crown was the best choice she could make. ERM said it would interview a new representative to represent Singapore at Miss World 2009, and appointed the runner-up Pilar Arlando.

Career outside of pageant

Business Venture 
In December 2009, the 19-year-old began looking for sponsors for brand new three-in-one beauty pageant for Singapore. She had started to send out email messages to potential sponsors, such as malls and event organisers, spelling out details for the proposed event in the middle of 2010. The selling point, she wrote, is that three winners will be crowned at the same event – Miss Singapore, Mr Singapore and Mrs Singapore.

Radio DJ
From the 29 to 31 March 2010, local radio station 987FM announced that they would put Low as a DJ on the Shan and Rozz show. There was a big outcry, both towards the radio station's decision as well as Low's poor English during the show. In the end, the station announced that it was an April Fools' Day joke publicising Burger King's new burger, the Angry Whopper.

Acting 
In 2012, Low acted in a slasher film, Justice Devil, which was released in 2014.

Personal life

Bipolar disorder
On 26 September 2009, Ris Low revealed to The Straits Times in a phone interview that she has bipolar disorder. In a subsequent interview published by The Sunday Times, she revealed that she got her bipolar disorder officially diagnosed after heeding a suggestion by her lawyer to get a medical check up in the hopes of distancing herself from her wrongdoings. She said it requires medication and psychiatric visits. She revealed that she has had the urge to steal since young and stole Pokémon cards once in Primary One. The act provided her with a sense of achievement: "that you've done something and you got away with it." Her mother detected the problem when she noticed the growing collection of toys and taught her to count to ten and walk away when faced with the urge.

Molestation incident 
On 17 March 2010, Low claimed that a stranger pulled down her tube top and groped her breast. Although she has since filed a police report, the incident was met with scepticism by netizens, and many believed it was a publicity stunt.

References 

Living people
Singaporean beauty pageant winners
Beauty pageant controversies
1985 births
People with bipolar disorder
People convicted of fraud
Singaporean people of Chinese descent